Justice Coleman may refer to:

Benjamin Wilson Coleman, associate justice of the Supreme Court of Nevada
Daniel Coleman (Alabama judge), associate justice of the Alabama Supreme Court
James P. Coleman, associate justice of the Supreme Court of Mississippi
James S. Coleman (judge), associate justice of the Alabama Supreme Court
Josiah D. Coleman, associate justice of the Supreme Court of Mississippi
Mary S. Coleman, associate justice of the Supreme Court of Michigan
Thomas W. Coleman, associate justice of the Alabama Supreme Court